Pedro Mathey (13 March 1928 – 8 October 1985) was a Peruvian cyclist. He competed in the individual and team road race events at the 1948 Summer Olympics.

References

External links
 

1928 births
1985 deaths
Peruvian male cyclists
Olympic cyclists of Peru
Cyclists at the 1948 Summer Olympics
Sportspeople from Callao
20th-century Peruvian people